"Every Woman Dreams" is a song by American R&B singer Shanice, released in early–2006 as the lead single from her fifth album, Every Woman Dreams. The song was co-written by her, along with husband Flex Alexander, Cynthia Wilson and her first single in six years. The song failed to chart on Billboard Hot 100; however, it peaked to no. 62 on Billboard's R&B/Hip-Hop Songs chart.

Music video
The music video features Shanice's husband love interest, and shows the two embracing in between shots of Shanice by herself, declaring the good man she has.

Charts

References

Shanice songs
2005 singles
2005 songs
Songs written by Shanice